The World Super 6 Perth is a golf tournament that was played for the first time in October 2012 as the ISPS Handa Perth International. It is played at Lake Karrinyup Country Club in Perth, Western Australia. It is co-sanctioned by the European Tour and the PGA Tour of Australasia. From 2016 it has also been co-sanctioned by the Asian Tour. It is one of the richest golf tournaments in Australia, with a A$1.6 million purse.

Originally owned by WME-IMG, the tournament, from 2017, switched from a traditional 72-hole event to a 54-hole tournament with two cuts followed by match play.

Format from 2017
The format used since 2017 is similar to that used for the 2011 Surf Coast Knockout. It retains the 156-player field, with the cut being made at the top-65 and ties after 36 holes. After 54 holes, the field is cut to a fixed 24. The top eight players receive byes, with the tiebreaker being the overall third round score, then the last nine, then six, then three, and then the final hole to break ties. Ties for 24th place are determined by a sudden-death playoff.

On the final day, only six-hole match play contests are played. For matches all-square after the sixth hole, the players returned to a tee near the 18th fairway to play that one hole until a winner is determined. The first round includes the 16 players not receiving byes, randomly paired. In the second round, the eight winners play the eight players that did not play in the first round. There are then quarterfinals, semifinals and a final to determine the winner. Consolation matches are played to determine third through eighth place.

In 2017, the holes used on the final day were the 10th (par 4), 2nd (4), 8th (3), 11th (5), 12th (3), and 18th (4).

Winners

Notes

References

External links
Coverage on European Tour's official site
Coverage on PGA Tour of Australasia's official site
Coverage on Asian Tour's official site

Former European Tour events
Former PGA Tour of Australasia events
Former Asian Tour events
Golf tournaments in Australia
Sport in Perth, Western Australia
Recurring sporting events established in 2012
2012 establishments in Australia